Boxing in the 2020s is a list of notable fights and events in boxing during the decade from the year 2020 to 2029.

Lists of notable fights and events by year

2020
January
 January 8 – Jeison Roasrio knocked out Julian Williams in the 5th round to win the WBA (Super), IBF, and IBO light middleweight titles.
February
 February 8 – Gary Russell Jr. defeated Tugstsogt Nyambayar by unanimous decision to retain his WBC featherweight title
 February 15 – Caleb Plant successfully defended his IBF Super Middleweight title defeating Vincent Feigenbutz in the 10th round by technical knockout when the referee waived off the fight.
 February 22 – In the second part of what became a trilogy, Tyson Fury defeated Deontay Wilder in the 7th round when Wilder's corner threw in the towel, winning the WBC Heavyweight Title and then-vacant The Ring heavyweight title
March
 March 7 – Robert Helenius defeated Adam Kownacki in the 4th round by technical knockout to win the vacant WBA Gold heavyweight title
August
 August 1 – Angelo Leo defeated Tramaine Williams by unanimous decision to win the vacant WBO Junior Featherweight title
 August 8 – Jamal James defeated Thomas Dulorme by unanimous decision to win the vacant WBA interim welterweight title
 August 22 – Shawn Porter defeated Sebastian Formella by unanimous decision to win the vacant WBC Silver welterweight title
 August 29 – Erislandy Lara defeated Greg Vendetti by unanimous decision to retain the WBA (Regular) Light Middleweight title and win the vacant IBO Light Middleweight title
September
 September 20 – Juan Carlos Payano fought former champion Daniel Roman, who was ranked #3 by Ring Magazine, WBA and WBC and #4 by the WBO and #6 at super bantamweight at the time. Payano lost the fight via unanimous decision.
October
 October 31 – Gervonta Davis knocked out Léo Santa Cruz in the sixth round to remain unbeaten with a record of 24-0 and winning the WBA World Super Featherweight and World Lightweight titles.
 October 31 – Mario Barrios remained unbeaten and retained his WBA World Super Lightweight title knocking out Ryan Karl in the sixth round.

2022
January
 January 22 – Joe Smith Jr. retained his WBO light heavyweight title with a 9th-round TKO over Steve Geffrard.

March
 March 12 - In which some boxing experts call it the fight of the year, Leigh Wood came from behind to knock out Michael Conlin in the 12th round to retain his WBA featherweight title

September
 September 3 - In Mexico, Sivenathi Nontshinga earned an unanimous decision over Hector Flores to take the vacant IBF flyweight championship.

References

 2020s
2020s in sports